The Velebit uprising or Lika uprising was a minor action carried out by Ustaše militias against a Yugoslav gendarmerie station on 6 and 7 September 1932.

Preparation
In the area near Gospić, the Ustaše militia was well-organized and led by lawyer Andrija Artuković. Some other notable members of Gospić's Ustaše branch were landowner Marko Došen, former Austrian-Hungarian officer Juraj Juco Rukavina, traders Josip Tomljenović and Nikola Orešković, and tax clerk Josip Japunčić.

Rukavina had one of the more important roles in the uprising. He visited a number of villages to gain support from local inhabitants for the uprising. The Ustaše spread propaganda stating that Fascist Italy supported Croatian independence, and that the Ustaše would help them to gain the area near the Triglav and Ljubljana mountains, while the Italians would give Rijeka and Trieste to Croatia. 

Since the main goal was sabotage of the military depot and garrison in Gospić, the Ustaše tried to establish contact with some military personnel, but without major success. The Ustaše from Gospić were in contact with the Ustaše in emigration, constantly exchanging information and advice. Before the beginning of the action, Italian authorities gave permission to the Ustaše to start the action. Ustaše leader Ante Brkan was responsible for transferring arms from Italy through Zadar, which was then part of the Italian state. In early 1932 the first arms were transferred, with a major shipment of arms arriving in August. 

At the same time the Ustaše prepared by enlisting men for the action. Two sergeants, Josip Čačić and Ante Malbaša agreed to participate. Five armed and uniformed Ustaše arrived from Italy, among whom was Rafael Boban. They hid in a house of some peasants in Lukovo Šugarje village, and were later followed by another five Ustaše.

At a meeting held in Spittal in Austria held on 28 August 1932, Ante Pavelić, Gustav Perčec, and Vjekoslav Servatzy decided to start a small uprising. Servatzy was chosen to organize the action. Before the action started, Artuković and Došen went to Zadar to avoid arrest by the Yugoslav gendarmerie.

Attack on the gendarmerie station at Brušane 
During the night between 6 and 7 September, the Ustaše launched an attack on the gendarmerie station in Brušane village near Gospić. Besides the ten Ustaše that arrived, some Ustaše from Gospić also participated in the assault. Before the attack, the Ustaše cut the phone lines to the gendarmerie station in Gospić, then opened fire on the gendarmerie station in Brušane. The attack lasted for half an hour, after which the Ustaše who lived in Croatia returned to their homes, while those who came from Italy went to Zadar across the Velebit. Though the leader of the action, Artuković, escaped, he was arrested and put on trial in 1936 in Belgrade. He was accused, among other Ustaše, of destruction of the gendarmerie station on the night of the action. One member of the group, Stjepan Devčić, was killed at Jadovno by gendarmerie members during the follow-up operation.

Aftermath 
Despite the small scale of the uprising, the Yugoslav authorities were unnerved because the power of the Ustaše was unknown. As a result, major security measures were introduced. This action had an impact in the foreign media, especially among the Italian and Hungarian press. In November 1932 in an article published in the official gazette of the Communist Party of Yugoslavia, party general secretary Milan Gorkić criticised the communist leadership in Dalmatia because they did not join Ustaše during the Velebit uprising.

References
Notes

Bibliography
 
 
 

1932 in Croatia
Rebellions in Yugoslavia
20th century in Croatia
Ustaše
1932 in Yugoslavia
Conflicts in 1932
September 1932 events
20th-century military history of Croatia